Neptis dumetorum is a butterfly in the family Nymphalidae. It is found on Réunion in the Indian Ocean.

Host plants
Known host plants of this butterfly are:  Acalypha wilkesiana, Trochetia granulata, Sida carpinifolia (Malvaceae) and Acalypha integrifolia (Euphorbiaceae).

References

Butterflies described in 1833
dumetorum